Pavel Sergeyevich Golyshev (born 7 July 1987) is a Russian footballer.

Club career
He made his Russian Premier League debut for FC Moscow on 6 November 2005 in a game against FC Shinnik Yaroslavl. He subsequently played in the RPL for FC Spartak Moscow, FC Tom Tomsk and FC Krasnodar.

Personal life
He is a brother of Dmitri Golyshev.

External links
  Player page on the official FC Moscow website
 
 

1987 births
Footballers from Moscow
Living people
Russian footballers
Russian expatriate footballers
Russia under-21 international footballers
Russia national football B team footballers
Association football midfielders
FC Moscow players
FC Spartak Moscow players
FC Tom Tomsk players
FC Spartak Vladikavkaz players
FC Krasnodar players
FC Tosno players
PFC Krylia Sovetov Samara players
FC Baltika Kaliningrad players
FC Luch Vladivostok players
FC Nizhny Novgorod (2015) players
Navbahor Namangan players
Russian Premier League players
Russian First League players
Uzbekistan Super League players
Russian expatriate sportspeople in Uzbekistan
Expatriate footballers in Uzbekistan